Daviesia stricta is a species of flowering plant in the family Fabaceae and is endemic to inland areas of South Australia. It is an open, glabrous shrub with narrowly-winged branchlets, scattered, narrowly elliptic to linear phyllodes and orange and purplish flowers.

Description

Taxonomy
Daviesia stricta was first formally described in 1982 by Michael Crisp in the Journal of the Adelaide Botanic Gardens from specimens he collected at Wilpena Pound in 1974. The specific epithet (stricta) means "very upright", referring to the branchlets and phyllodes.

Distribution and habitat
This daviesia grows in shrubland on ridge-tops in the Flinders Ranges of South Australia.

References

stricta
Taxa named by Michael Crisp
Plants described in 1982
Flora of South Australia